USS Grackle is a name used more than once by the U.S. Navy:

 , was launched in 1919 by the Bath Iron Works, Bath, Maine
 , was launched 9 November 1943 by Henry B. Nevins, Inc., City Island, New York
 Grackle (AM-396), was under construction when her contract was terminated 12 August 1945

United States Navy ship names